The John P. Fisher House is a historic house on the shores of Bayou Bartholomew in Ashley County, Arkansas, west of the city of Portland.  The two story wood frame Greek Revival house is located north of the junction of Arkansas Highway 160 and County Road 50, west of the bayou bridge.  It was built c. 1850 for John Fisher, not long after Ashley County was organized, near the town of Alligator Bluff, which was located on the other side of the bayou, and which was later supplanted by Portland with the arrival of the railroad.  It is the only known antebellum Greek Revival house in the county.

The house was listed on the National Register of Historic Places in 1995.

See also
National Register of Historic Places listings in Ashley County, Arkansas

References

Houses on the National Register of Historic Places in Arkansas
Greek Revival houses in Arkansas
Houses completed in 1850
Houses in Ashley County, Arkansas
National Register of Historic Places in Ashley County, Arkansas
1850 establishments in Arkansas